Komyandaret is a poorly documented Papuan language of Indonesia. It is close enough to Tsaukambo that there is some mutual intelligibility.

References

Hughes, Jock. 2009. Upper Digul Survey. SIL International.

Languages of western New Guinea
Ok languages
Becking–Dawi languages